is a 2009 Japanese drama television series based on the 1905 children's novel A Little Princess by Frances Hodgson Burnett. Mirai Shida stars as Seira, the daughter of a rich boss of a mining company. Due to her father's sudden death in a mining accident, Seira has overcomes many ordeals at the Millenius Seminary boarding school because she is unable to pay her school fees.

Shōkōjo Seira aired on Saturdays from 7:56pm on the Tokyo Broadcasting System between 17 October and 19 December 2009.

Plot
Seira was raised in India, but she is sent back to Japan to continue her education at an affluent boarding high school her mother went to. Although she has lived in luxury, the well-bred Seira is kind and generous, earning her many friends at the school. One person who dislikes Seira is the school's director, though she treats Seira well due to the father's fortune. Then, during Seira's 16th birthday party, the director informs her that her father has died, leaving her penniless. As a result, she is forced to work as a servant in order to pay off her school bills.

It was found out in the latter stages that the director despised Seira's mother, thus expressing her revenge. In the end it was found out that his father's assets were unfrozen, and she became very rich once again. Since Millenius school was on the verge of bankruptcy, Seira saved it by becoming the sole proprietor, but as a condition she would be readmitted back to school. Thus the competition between Kuroda Seira, Takeda Maria and Mizushima Kaori to become the school captain emerged for good.

Cast
 Mirai Shida as Kuroda Seira
 Kento Hayashi as Kaito Miura
 Seiichi Tanabe as Yukio Aran
 Anri Okamoto as Masami Shoji
 Shiori Kutsuna as Kaori Mizushima
 Jun Kaname as Yoshito Kurisu
 Fujiko Kojima as Maria Takeda 
 Tsugumi Shinohara as Hinako Kawahara 
 Sara Takatsuki as Makoto Asahina
 Hikari Kikuzato as Naomi Shimizu
 Mami Asaoka as Kyoko Honjo
 Natsuko Aso as Mamiko Yoko
 Mizuki Sashide as Rion Jingu
 Rima Nishizaki
 Kayano Masuyama
 Atsushi Yanaka as Ryunosuke Kuroda
 Shinya Owada as Seiichiro Onuma
 Tomoka Kurokawa as Kaoruko Kuroda
 Yuriko Hirooka as Hideko Onuma
 Yuki Saito as Emiko Mimura
 Kanako Higuchi as Chieko Mimura

Episodes

References

External links
  
 

2009 Japanese television series debuts
2009 Japanese television series endings
Films based on A Little Princess
Japanese drama television series
Fictional princesses
Television shows written by Yoshikazu Okada
TBS Television (Japan) dramas
Television shows based on American novels
Television shows based on British novels
Television shows set in India